Jean-Luc Lagardère (10 February 1928, Aubiet – 14 March 2003, Paris) was a major French businessman, CEO of the Lagardère Group, one of the largest French conglomerates.

Jean-Luc Lagardère was a Supelec engineer. He began his career in Dassault Aviation. CEO of Matra in the 1960s, he became famous with success in Formula One and Le Mans. He later built a large media and defense conglomerate that bears his name. He was a member of the Saint-Simon Foundation think-tank.

In 1981, with his friend Daniel Filipacchi, he purchased Hachette magazines, which included the French TV Guide (Tele 7 Jours), and the then-struggling Elle magazine. Elle was then launched in the U.S., followed by 25 foreign editions. Filipacchi and Lagardère then expanded Hachette Filipacchi Magazines in the U.S. with the purchase of Diamandis Communications Inc. (formerly CBS magazines), including Woman's Day, Car and Driver, Road and Track, Flying, Boating, and many others.

He was married to Bethy Lagardère, whose birth name is Elizabeth Pimenta Lucas (Belo Horizonte, 29 March 1949), a socialite and former Brazilian model who settled in France.

Thoroughbred horse racing
Lagardère was a prominent figure in French horse racing. In 1981, he purchased the renowned Haras d'Ouilly stud in Pont-d'Ouilly, Calvados that had been owned by François Dupré and raced under their famous colors of gray with a pink cap. At one time, his operation had as many as 220 horses. He won the French owners' championship in 1998 and between 1995 and 2001 was the leading breeder in France. His most important racing win came with Sagamix who won the 1998 Prix de l'Arc de Triomphe.

Upon its formation in 1995, Jean-Luc Lagardère served as the first president of France-Galop. On his death in 2003, the business was taken over by his son Arnaud who sold Haras d'Ouilly and its entire bloodstock in 2005 to the Aga Khan IV.

In 2002, the Group One Grand Critérium race for two-year-olds at Longchamp Racecourse was renamed in his honor.

Death
Lagardere died on March 14, 2003, from a rare neurological condition.

References

 Jean-Luc Lagardere at the NTRA
Madjar, Robert (1997).  Daniel Filipacchi.  Editions Michel Lafon

1928 births
2003 deaths
Supélec alumni
French book publishers (people)
French magazine publishers (people)
French mass media owners
Jean-Luc
French racehorse owners and breeders
Formula One team principals
Paris Match writers
Owners of Prix de l'Arc de Triomphe winners